In mathematics, the Minkowski–Steiner formula is a formula relating the surface area and volume of compact subsets of Euclidean space. More precisely, it defines the surface area as the "derivative" of enclosed volume in an appropriate sense.

The Minkowski–Steiner formula is used, together with the Brunn–Minkowski theorem, to prove the isoperimetric inequality. It is named after Hermann Minkowski and Jakob Steiner.

Statement of the Minkowski-Steiner formula

Let , and let  be a compact set. Define the quantity  by the Minkowski–Steiner formula

where

denotes the closed ball of radius , and

Remarks

Surface measure

See Federer (1969) for a full treatment of this problem.

Convex sets

When the set  is a convex set, the lim-inf above is a true limit, and one can show that

where  denotes the Gamma function.

Example: volume and surface area of a ball

Taking  gives the following well-known formula for the surface area of the sphere of radius , :

where  is as above.

References

 
 

Calculus of variations
Geometry
Hermann Minkowski
Measure theory
Theorems in measure theory